Miss Malaysia Universe 2005, the 39th edition of the Miss Universe Malaysia, was held on 30 March 2005 at Kuala Lumpur. Angela Gan of Sabah was crowned by the outgoing titleholder, Andrea Fonseka of Penang at the end of the event. She then represented Malaysia at the Miss Universe 2005 pageant in Bangkok, Thailand.

Results

References 

2005 in Malaysia
2005 beauty pageants
2005